Americanization of the European Economy. A compact survey of American economic influence in Europe since the 1880s is a 2005 book by Harm G. Schroeter focusing, as the title implies, on the economic aspect of the Americanization of Europe.

References 

2005 non-fiction books
Books about Europe
Books about economic history